Finding Maubee is a 1971 detective novel by Albert H. Z. Carr set in a fictional Caribbean island called St. Caro.  Published after Carr's death, it earned Carr a posthumous Edgar Award in the category of Best First Novel.

The novel was made into a 1989 American film titled The Mighty Quinn starring Denzel Washington and Robert Townsend.

References

American detective novels
American mystery novels
1971 American novels
American novels adapted into films